Naisula Josephine Lesuuda (born 30 April 1984), is a Kenyan politician and women's rights activist. She is a Member of the Parliament of Kenya.

Early life and education
Lesuuda was born in Samburu on 30 April 1984, the first of three children born to an Anglican bishop and a businesswoman. She graduated from Daystar University with a Degree in Communications and Community Development.

Career
Lesuuda worked as a journalist at the Kenya Broadcasting Corporation, including hosting Good Morning Kenya. In 2009, after ten people were killed in cattle rustling in Laikipia, she became a founding member of the Laikipia Peace Caravan. This in turn led to the founding of a number of other local peace organisations, supported by the Kenya government and USAid. In 2010, her work with this organisation led to her becoming the youngest Kenyan woman to win the presidential Order of the Grand Warrior.

In 2013, Lesuuda left her job to found the Naisula Lesuuda Peace Foundation which advocates for the education of girls and for the eradication of female genital mutilation and child marriage.

Lesuuda participated in President Uhuru Kenyatta's campaign in 2013, and was then nominated on his TNA party ticket to represent Samburu County in the Senate in 2013, becoming its youngest female member. She was then elected Vice Chair of the Kenyan Women's Parliamentary Association.

In 2016, she announced that she would leave the Senate to seek election as a member of the National Assembly for Samburu West, then in 2017 switching from the Jubilee to KANU party. She has maintained her support for Kenyatta.

At the 2017 election, Lesuuda was elected with 14,560 votes, defeating incumbent Jonathan Lelelit who received 13,970 votes, becoming the first female member of parliament for the constituency. When parliament sat in August 2017, she announced her intention to apply for the position of Deputy Speaker, but failed to submit her application before the vote.

She was re-elected in Samburu West Constituency at the 2022 general election.

Awards and honours

 Presidential Order of the Grand Warrior for her journalistic work highlighting social issues and promoting peace, 2010
 International Labour Organization Wedge Award for Outstanding Professional Woman, 2011

Personal life
Lesuuda is unmarried. In 2017, stories emerged in the Kenyan press about a relationship between Lesuuda and her married Senate colleague, Kipchumba Murkomen.

References

External links
 Naisula Lesuuda: From journalist to Senator

Living people
1984 births
21st-century Kenyan women politicians
21st-century Kenyan politicians
Kenya African National Union politicians
Kenyan television journalists
Members of the Senate of Kenya
Kenyan women's rights activists
Kenyan women television journalists
Kenyan activists
Kenyan women activists
Members of the 12th Parliament of Kenya
Members of the 13th Parliament of Kenya